Godwatch is a group of supervillains appearing in comic books published by DC Comics. The group consists of several of Wonder Woman's major enemies.

Fictional team history
Founded by Veronica Cale, the purpose of Godwatch was to discover the location of Themyscira. The gods Deimos and Phobos had taken the soul of Cale's daughter, Isadore, and used her as ransom against Cale. They planned to find Themyscira to free their father, Ares, from his imprisonment by the Amazons.

Cale recruited her best friend Adrianna Anderson, who died and became the cybernetic creature known as Doctor Cyber while aiding her friend against Wonder Woman. Cale also utilized her personal bodyguard Colonel Marina Maru and her agents from Team Poison, a group of female mercenaries. Cheetah was at one time a member of Godwatch, as she despised Wonder Woman for allowing her to become a monster. Unbeknownst to her, Godwatch was actually partially responsible for Minerva's transformation into the Cheetah. 

Deimos and Phobos grew impatient with Cale, which led to several threats by the twins. Cale, fearful that the gods wouldn't return her daughter to her, sought out the aid of Circe, who transformed the twins into dogs. As dogs, Deimos and Phobos were forced into loyalty to Cale.

Veronica Cale then captured Cheetah and forced her to help Godwatch locate Themyscira. Cale was reunited with her daughter, though Ares revealed that Isadore's body and mind would split again if they left his prison. Isadore decided to stay with the Amazons on Themyscira, leaving Cale bitter and resentful. Cale distanced herself from Doctor Cyber and Colonel Maru while being investigated by the FBI.

Some time later, Veronica Cale recruited Zara of the Crimson Flame, Blue Snowman, and Anglette into her services, equipping them with stolen technology. Each of the three criminals battled Wonder Woman individually, though with each battle resulting in the villain's defeat.

Doctor Cyber soon returned to Veronica Cale's services, and offered to help her former best friend capture the Cheetah for revenge against her earlier attacks. Godwatch succeeded in apprehending Cheetah, and Doctor Poison attempted to experiment on her. However, Cheetah broke free from her captivity and attempted to kill Cale, though Wonder Woman's intervention allowed Cale to escape.

Members

See also
List of Wonder Woman enemies

References

DC Comics supervillain teams
Wonder Woman characters
DC Comics female supervillains